Udry is a surname. Notable people with this surname include:
Christopher Udry, American economist
J. Richard Udry (1929–2012), American sociologist and demographer
Janice May Udry (born 1928), American author and widow of J. Richard
Stéphane Udry (born 1961), Swiss astronomer